Donald John Mackay Petrie (May 22, 1922 – July 6, 2015) was a Canadian soccer player and head coach.

Career 
Petrie was born in Vancouver, British Columbia. He played for Vancouver St. Saviour's between 1942 and 1943, University of British Columbia between 1943 and 1946, St. Saviours again between 1946 and 1947, and Vancouver City between 1947–1948.

Petrie coached the Vancouver Halecos, helping them win the Canadian club championship in 1956. He also coached the Canadian national team in 1957, in World Cup qualifying games against Mexico and the United States.

Personal life 
Petrie was married to Grace Petrie and resided in White Rock, British Columbia. He had three children—Don, Robert, and Brenda, and four grandchildren—Kelly, Whitney, Adam, and Steven. Petrie died on July 6, 2015 at the age of 93.

In April 2000, Petrie was inducted as a Builder into the Canadian Soccer Hall of Fame.

References

External links
 / Canada Soccer Hall of Fame

1922 births
2015 deaths
Canada men's national soccer team managers
Canadian soccer coaches
Canadian soccer players
Canada Soccer Hall of Fame inductees
Soccer players from Vancouver
UBC Thunderbirds soccer players
Vancouver City S.C. players
Association footballers not categorized by position